Maoraxia is a genus of beetles in the family Buprestidae, containing the following species:

 Maoraxia auroimpressa (Carter, 1924)
 Maoraxia bourgeoisi Bily, Curletti & Aberlenc, 1985
 Maoraxia cordicollis (Fauvel, 1891)
 Maoraxia eremita (White, 1846)
 Maoraxia excavata (Fauvel, 1891)
 Maoraxia kladavuensis Bellamy, 2008
 Maoraxia purpurea Bellamy, 1990
 Maoraxia roseocuprea Bellamy & Peterson, 2000
 Maoraxia storeyi Williams & Bellamy, 1985
 Maoraxia tokotaai Bellamy, 2008
 Maoraxia tongae Bellamy, 1985
 Maoraxia viridis Bellamy, 1985
 Maoraxia viti Bellamy, 2008

References

Buprestidae genera